The 63rd Cannes Film Festival was held from 12 to 23 May 2010, in Cannes, France. The Cannes Film Festival, hailed as being one of the most recognized and prestigious film festivals worldwide, was founded in 1946. It consists of having films screened in and out of competition during the festival; films screened in competition compete for the Palme d'Or award. The award in 2010 was won by Uncle Boonmee Who Can Recall His Past Lives, a Thai film directed by Apichatpong Weerasethakul. This was determined by the festival's jury members who reviewed films screened in competition. American film director Tim Burton was the president of the jury for the international competition, and other members of the jury for that competition included actors, screenwriters and composers, such as Kate Beckinsale, Emmanuel Carrère, Benicio del Toro, and Alexandre Desplat. Other categories for films screened in competition that have their own separate juries for other awards are for Short Films and the Un Certain Regard category.

Ridley Scott's Robin Hood opened the festival and Julie Bertuccelli's The Tree was the closing film. The full film lineup for the festival was announced on 15 April 2010. English actress Kristin Scott Thomas was the mistress of ceremonies.

Agence France-Presse, Reuters, Associated Press and Getty TV boycotted the press conference that announced the line-up for the festival, due to a dispute over access to the red carpet. In a press release, the agencies said that they "may be forced to suspend their presence at the festival altogether" if an agreement was not reached. Days before the festival was to begin, concerns were expressed that attendees might be delayed, or would not attend, due to plane flights to surrounding areas in France being delayed or canceled due to volcanic ash in the sky. Two days before the beginning of the festival, the just finished film Route Irish, directed by Ken Loach, was added to the main competition.

Juries

Main competition
The following people were appointed as the Jury for the feature films of the 2010 Official Selection:
 Tim Burton (American director) Jury President
 Alberto Barbera (Italian film critic)
 Kate Beckinsale (English actress)
 Emmanuel Carrère (French author, screenwriter and director)
 Benicio del Toro (Puerto Rican actor)
 Alexandre Desplat (French composer)
 Víctor Erice (Spanish director)
 Shekhar Kapur (Indian director)
 Giovanna Mezzogiorno (Italian actress)

Un Certain Regard
 Claire Denis (French director) President
 Patrick Ferla (Swiss journalist)
 Kim Dong-ho (South Korean director of Busan Film Festival)
 Helena Lindblad (Swedish critic)
 Serge Toubiana (French General Director of the Cinémathèque Française)

Camera d'Or
 Gael García Bernal (Mexican director) President
 Gérard de Battista (French cinematographer)
 Stéphane Brizé (French director)
 Didier Diaz (FICAM)
 Charlotte Lipinska (French Union Critics)

Cinéfondation and short films
 Atom Egoyan (Canadian director) President
 Emmanuelle Devos (French actress)
 Carlos Diegues (Brazilian director)
 Dinara Droukarova (Russian actress)
 Marc Recha (Spanish Director)

Official selection

In competition - Feature films
The following feature films competed for the Palme d'Or:

Un Certain Regard
The following films were selected for the competition of Un Certain Regard:

Films out of competition
The following films were selected to be screened out of competition:

Special screenings
The following films were shown as special screenings.

Cinéfondation
The following short films were selected for the competition of Cinéfondation:

 * denotes first time a school was selected to compete

Short film competition
The following short films competed for the Short Film Palme d'Or:

Cannes Classics
Cannes Classics places the spotlight on documentaries about cinema and restored masterworks from the past.

World Cinema Foundation

Cinéma de la Plage
The Cinéma de la Plage is a part of the Official Selection of the festival. The outdoors screenings at the beach cinema of Cannes are open to the public.

Parallel sections

International Critics' Week 
The following films were screened for the 49th International Critics' Week (49e Semaine de la Critique):

Feature film competition

 Armadillo by Janus Metz (Denmark)
 Bedevilled by Jang Cheol-so (South Korea)
 Belle Épine by Rebecca Zlotowski (France)
 Bi, Don't Be Afraid (Bi, dung so!) by Di Dang Phan (Vietnam, France, Germany)
 Sandcastle (film) by Boo Junfeng (Singapore)
 Sound of Noise by Ola Simonsson, Johannes Stjärne Nilsson (Sweden, France)
 The Myth of the American Sleepover by David Robert Mitchell (United States)

Short film competition

 A distração by Ivan Cavi Borges, Gustavo Melo (Brazil)
 Berik by Daniel Joseph Borgman (Denmark)
 Deeper Than Yesterday by Ariel Kleiman (Australia)
 Love Patate by Gilles Cuvelier (France)
 Native Son by Scott Graham (United Kingdom)
 The Boy Who Wanted to Be a Lion by Alois Di Leo (United Kingdom)
 Vasco by Sébastien Laudenbach (France)

Special screening

The Names of Love (Le Nom des gens) by Michel Leclerc (France)
Copacabana by Marc Fitoussi (France)
Rubber by Quentin Dupieux (France)
Women Are Heroes by JR (France)

Short and medium length

Bastard by Kirsten Dunst (United States)
The Clerk’s Tale by James Franco (United States)
L'Amour-propre by Nicolas Silhol (France)
Cynthia todavía tienes las llaves by Gonzalo Tobal (Argentina)
Fracture by Nicolas Sarkissian (France)

Directors' Fortnight
The documentary film Benda Bilili! about disabled Kinshasa street musicians Staff Benda Bilili had its world premiere at the festival, with the group in attendance and performing at the Director's Fortnight opening party.

The following films were screened for the 2010 Directors' Fortnight (Quinzaine des Réalizateurs):

Feature films

 All Good Children by Alicia Duffy (Ireland, Belgium, France, United Kingdom)
 Año bisiesto by Michael Rowe (Mexico)
 Benda Bilili! by Renaud Barret, Florent de La Tullaye (France)
 Boxing Gym by Frederick Wiseman (United States)
 Cleveland versus Wall Street (Cleveland contre Wall Street) by Jean-Stéphane Bron (Switzerland, France)
 Des filles en noir by Jean Paul Civeyrac (France)
 Everything Will Be Fine by Christoffer Boe (Denmark, Sweden, France)
 Illegal (Illégal) by Olivier Masset-Depasse (Belgium, Luxembourg, France)
 The Invisible Eye (La mirada invisible) by Diego Lerman (Argentina, France, Spain)
 Le Vagabond by Avishai Sivan (Israel)
 Le quattro volte by Michelangelo Frammartino (Italy, Germany, Switzerland)
 Petit bébé Jésus de Flandre by Gust Van den Berghe (Belgium)
 Picco by Philip Koch (Germany)
 Pieds nus sur les limaces by Fabienne Berthaud (France)
 Shit Year by Cam Archer (United States)
 The Joy by Felipe Bragança, Marina Meliande (Brazil)
 The Light Thief (Svet-Ake) by Aktan Arym Kubat (Kirghizistan, Germany, France, Netherlands)
 The Silent House by Gustavo Hernández (Uruguay)
 The Tiger Factory by Ming jin Woo (Malaysia, Japan)
 Two Gates of Sleep by Alistair Banks Griffin (United States)
 Love Like Poison (Un poison violent) by Katell Quillévéré (France)
 You All Are Captains (Todos vós sodes capitáns) by Oliver Laxe (Spain)
 We Are What We Are (Somos lo que hay) by Jorge Michel Grau (Mexico)

Short films

 A Silent Child by Jesper Klevenås (Sweden)
 Light by André Schreuders (Netherlands)
 Mary Last Seen by Sean Durkin (United States)
 Petit tailleur by Louis Garrel (France)
 Cautare by Ionuţ Piţurescu (Romania)
 Shadows of Silence by Pradeepan Raveendran (France)
 Shikasha by Isamu Hirabayashi (Japan)
 Three Hours by Annarita Zambrano (Italy, France)
 ZedCrew by Noah Pink (Canada, Zambia)

Awards

Official awards
The Palme d'Or was won by the Thai film Uncle Boonmee Who Can Recall His Past Lives directed by Apichatpong Weerasethakul. It was the first time that an Asian movie won the award since 1997. Tim Burton, chairman of the jury that determined the award, stated about its decision: "You always want to be surprised by films and this film did that for most of us." French film Of Gods and Men was the runner up. The Xavier Beauvois-directed film had been considered a favourite for the Palme d'Or along with Mike Leigh's Another Year. During the ceremony special attention was paid to Iranian filmmaker Jafar Panahi in hopes of increasing international pressure on the Iranian government to release Panahi from jail.

The following films and people received the 2010 Official selection awards:
In Competition
 Palme d'Or: Uncle Boonmee Who Can Recall His Past Lives by Apichatpong Weerasethakul
 Grand Prix:  Of Gods and Men by Xavier Beauvois
 Best Director Award: Mathieu Amalric for On Tour
 Best Screenplay Award: Poetry by Lee Chang-dong
 Best Actress Award: Juliette Binoche for Certified Copy
 Best Actor Award: Javier Bardem for Biutiful & Elio Germano for Our Life
 Prix du Jury: A Screaming Man by Mahamat-Saleh Haroun
Un Certain Regard
 Prix Un Certain Regard: Hahaha by Hong Sang-soo
 Un Certain Regard Jury Prize: October by Daniel Vega, Diego Vega
 Un Certain Regard Best Actress Award: Adela Sanchez, Eva Bianco, Victoria Raposo for The Lips
Cinéfondation
 First Prize: – The Painting Sellers by Juho Kuosmanen
 2nd Prize: Anywhere Out of the World by Vincent Cardona
 3rd Prize: The Fifth Column by  Vatche Boulghourjian and I Already Am Everything I Want to Have by Dane Komljen
Golden Camera
 Caméra d'Or: Año Bisiesto by Michael Rowe
Short films
 Short Film Palme d'Or: Barking Island by Serge Avédikian
 Short Film Jury Prize: Bathing Micky by Frida Kempff

Independent awards
FIPRESCI Prizes
 On Tour (Tournée) by Mathieu Amalric (In Competition)
 Adrienn Pál (Pál Adrienn) by Ágnes Kocsis (Un Certain Regard)
 You All Are Captains (Todos vós sodes capitáns) by Oliver Laxe (Directors' Fortnight)

Vulcan Award of the Technical Artist
 Vulcan Award: Leslie Shatz, Bob Beemer, Jon Taylor (Sound Department) for Biutiful

Ecumenical Jury
 Prize of the Ecumenical Jury: Of Gods and Men (Des hommes et des dieux) by Xavier Beauvois
 Prize of the Ecumenical Jury - Special Mention: Another Year by Mike Leigh &  Poetry (Shi) by Lee Chang-dong

Awards in the frame of International Critics' Week
 Critics Week Grand Prize: Armadillo by Janus Metz
 SACD Award: Bi, Don't Be Afraid (Bi, dung so!) by Di Dang Phan
 ACID Award: Bi, Don't Be Afraid (Bi, dung so!) by Di Dang Phan
 Young Critics Award: Sound of Noise by Ola Simonsson, Johannes Stjärne Nilsson
 Canal+ Gran Prix for short film: Berik by Daniel Joseph Borgman
 Kodak Discovery Award for Best Short Film: Deeper Than Yesterday by Ariel Kleiman

Other awards
 Regards Jeunes Prize: Heartbeats (Les amours imaginaires) by Xavier Dolan

Association Prix François Chalais
 Prix François Chalais: Life, Above All by Oliver Schmitz

References

External links

Official website Retrospective 2010
63ème Festival de Cannes, cinema-francais.fr
Cannes Film Festival:2010 at Internet Movie Database

Cannes Film Festival
Cannes Film Festival
Cannes Film Festival
Cannes Film Festival